Statistics of American Soccer League II in season 1956–57.

League standings

League awards
 MVP: John Oliver

References

American Soccer League II (RSSSF)

American Soccer League (1933–1983) seasons
1956–57 in American soccer